Ian Martin (born 1951) is an Australian rugby league footballer who played in the 1960s and 1970s.  Martin is a multi premiership winning player with the Manly-Warringah Sea Eagles.

Career
Martin was graded as a 16-year-old with Manly in 1967. He played nine seasons of first grade football with Manly-Warringah Sea Eagles between 1969-1974 and 1976-1978. 

Martin holds the rare distinction of playing in six grand finals with Manly, winning four of them. His first was in the side that lost the 1970 Grand Final to Souths. He then starred in the winning Manly-Warringah Sea Eagles teams of 1972, 1973, 1976 and the 1978 draw and replay.

He started his career as a brilliant five-eighth, and finished his career as a lock-forward. Ian Martin played 155 first grade games, and scored 34 tries during his career. His only representative appearances were for New South Wales in 1972, and after a short stint as the captain-coach of Sawtell, New South Wales in 1975, he represented N.S.W. Country Firsts that year. Martin retired at the conclusion of the 1978 NSWRFL season.

References

Manly Warringah Sea Eagles players
Manly Warringah Sea Eagles captains
New South Wales rugby league team players
Australian rugby league coaches
Australian rugby league players
Living people
1951 births
Rugby league five-eighths
Rugby league locks